The 1870 Vermont gubernatorial election took place on September 6, 1870. In keeping with the "Mountain Rule", incumbent Republican George W. Hendee, who had succeeded to the governorship at the death of Peter T. Washburn, did not run for election to a full term as Governor of Vermont. Republican candidate John W. Stewart defeated Democratic candidate Homer W. Heaton to succeed Hendee. The 1870 election marked the start of biennial gubernatorial elections in Vermont.

Results

References

Vermont
1870
Gubernatorial
September 1870 events